Bubu or Bu Bu may refer to:

Arts and entertainment
 Bubu music, a traditional Temne music of Sierra Leone
 Bubù (film), a 1971 Italian historical drama film
 Bubu, a 1970s Argentine rock band
 Bubu, a 2000s Romanian band who represented Romania in the Junior Eurovision Song Contest.

People
 Bubu Mazibuko, South African actress
 Bubu Palo (born 1991), American basketball player nicknamed "Bubu"
 Ahmadu Hammadi Bubu (1776–1845), founder of the Massina Empire
 several kings of the Massina Empire
 Bubu I (reigned 1544–1551)
 Bubu II (reigned 1559–1583)
 Bubu III (reigned 1603–1613)

Other uses
 bubu, a traditional dance of Perak, Malaysia
 bubu, a type of fish trap
 Bubu, a brand name of PGO Scooters

See also

 
 
 Al-bubu, a version of the boogeyman
 Boo Boo (disambiguation)